Joshua ben Gamla , also called Jesus the son of Gamala, was a Jewish high priest in about 64-65 CE. He was killed during the First Jewish–Roman War. While the Talmud refers to Joshua ben Gamla, the earlier Greek works of Josephus Flavius call him Γαμάλα μὲν υἱὸς Ἰησοῦς (Gamala men huios Iesous) a semitism for: The son of Gamala, Jesus. 

Joshua married the rich widow Martha of the high-priestly family Boethus and was appointed High Priest by Herod Agrippa II. According to Talmudic sources, Martha bribed a "King Jannai" into appointing Joshua High Priest with a tarkab of denarii. This cannot refer to Alexander Jannaeus, who reigned 150 years earlier and was himself the High Priest, but may refer to King Agrippa II as is mentioned in the Talmudic notes. The two lots used on the Day of Atonement, hitherto of boxwood, he made of gold. Joshua did not remain long in office, being forced, after a year, to give way to Mattathias ben Theophilus.

Although Joshua himself was not a scholar, he was solicitous for the instruction of the young, and provided schools in every town for children over five years of age, earning thereby the praises of posterity. The Talmud states, "Joshua b. Gamala came and ordained that teachers of young children should be appointed in each district and each town, and that children should enter school at the age of six or seven." He is therefore regarded as the founder of the institution of formal Jewish education.

Although no longer High Priest, Joshua remained one of the leaders of Jerusalem. Together with another former high priest, Ananus ben Ananus, and other men of rank, he opposed, without success, the election of Phinehas b. Samuel (68) as high priest. Josephus reports that Joshua was an "intimate friend", who reported a plot to replace Josephus as general of Galilee to Josephus' father. Because his father wrote to him of the plot, Josephus was able to resist it.

Joshua attempted peaceably to prevent the fanatic and pugnacious Idumeans from entering Jerusalem during the Zealot Temple Siege. After they had come into possession of the city, these fanatics took bloody vengeance on him, killing both him and Ananus as traitors to their country (68).

Identification
Scholars have argued that Joshua ben Gamla of the Talmud is the same high priest from the days of the destruction, and that the priesthood was acquired from Herod Agrippa II.

References

1st-century High Priests of Israel
Mishnah rabbis
1st-century rabbis
People of the First Jewish–Roman War